Whiteman Park is a  bushland area located  north of Perth, Western Australia. The park is in the suburb of Whiteman, in the Swan Valley in the upper reaches of the Swan River.

It encompasses the source of Bennett Brook - an important place of the Nyoongar people, and a source of mythology of the Wagyl and stories about Aboriginal occupancy of the area.

Whiteman Park is known for its biodiversity, including more than 450 endemic plants and more than 120 vertebrate animals (some of which are rare and endangered). More than 17% of Western Australian bird species occur in Whiteman Park, including migratory birds attracted to the habitat provided by Bennett Brook and associated wetlands including Grogan's Swamp, a Conservation Category Wetland.

The state government purchased the land from a number of private owners in 1978 to protect the underlying aquifer as a drinking water source for Perth. The major owner was Lew Whiteman (1903–1994), after whom the park is named.

Attractions
Whiteman Park includes bushwalking trails, bike paths, sports facilities and playgrounds.

The park is also host to heritage transport groups and their collections.

 The Perth Electric Tramway Society runs a  electric tram journey through the park, running trams that include ones that were used in Melbourne, Perth and Fremantle.
 Caversham Wildlife Park
 Bennett Brook Railway
 The Tractor Museum of Western Australia
 The Western Australian Motor Museum
 Bus Preservation Society of Western Australia 
 Revolutions Transport Museum

References

External links

 Whiteman Park

 
Parks in Perth, Western Australia
Whiteman, Western Australia